Auquitaipe (possibly from Aymara awki father; gentleman, taypi center, middle) is a mountain in the Barroso mountain range in the Andes of Peru, about  high. It is located in the Tacna Region, Tacna Province, Palca District, and in the Tarata Province, Tarata District. It lies northeast of Coruña.

References 

Mountains of Peru
Mountains of Tacna Region